Tony Thurman (born March 15, 1962) is a former American football defensive back who played college football at Boston College. He was a consensus All-American in 1984. Thurman finished his college career with 25 interceptions. He was inducted into the Boston College Varsity Club Athletic Hall of Fame in 1992. He was named an ACC Legend in 2010.

References

External links
Tony Thurman video
Fanbase profile

Living people
1962 births
Players of American football from Massachusetts
American football defensive backs
Boston College Eagles football players
All-American college football players
Sportspeople from Lynn, Massachusetts
Players of American football from Jacksonville, Florida